Constance of Hungary (c. 1180 – 6 December 1240) was the second Queen consort of Ottokar I of Bohemia.

Family
Constance was a daughter of Béla III of Hungary and his first wife Agnes of Antioch. Her older siblings included Emeric, King of Hungary, Margaret of Hungary and Andrew II of Hungary.

Marriage and children
In 1199, Ottokar I divorced his first wife, Adelaide of Meissen, on grounds of consanguinity. He married Constance later in the same year. Together with Ottokar, she had nine children.

Queen Constance is regularly noted as a co-donator with her husband in various documents of his reign. Her petitions to her husband for various donations are also recorded. She is considered to have sold the city Boleráz to her nephew Béla IV of Hungary. In 1247, Béla conferred said city to the nuns of Trnava. An epistle by which Constance supposedly grants freedom to the cities of Břeclav and Olomouc is considered a false document. The same epistle grants lands in Ostrovany to the monastery of St. Stephen of Hradište. Another epistle has the queen settling "honorable Teutonic men" (viros honestos Theutunicos) in the city of Hodonín and is also considered a forgery. In 1230, Ottokar I died and their son Wenceslaus succeeded him. Constance survived her husband by a decade.

In 1231, Pope Gregory IX set Queen Constance and her dower possessions under the protection of the Holy See. His letter to Constance clarifies said possessions to include the provinces of Břeclav (Brecyzlaviensem), Pribyslavice (Pribizlavensem), Dolni Kunice (Conowizensem), Godens (Godeninensem), Bzenec (Bisenzensem) and Budějovice (Budegewizensem). In 1232, Constance founded Cloister Porta Coeli near Tišnov and retired to it as a nun. She died within the Cloister.

Issue
Vratislav (c. 1200 – before 1209)
Judith (c. 1202 – 2 June 1230), who married Bernhard von Spanheim, Duke of Carinthia
Anna (c. 1204 – 23 June 1265), who married Henry II the Pious, Duke of Wrocław
Agnes, thought to have died young
Wenceslaus I of Bohemia (c. 1205 – 23 September 1253)
Vladislaus, Margrave of Moravia (1207 – 10 February 1228)
Přemysl, Margrave of Moravia (1209 – 16 October 1239), who married Margaret, daughter of Otto I, Duke of Merania, and Beatrice II, Countess of Burgundy
Božena (Wilhelmina) (1210 – 24 October 1281)
Agnes (20 January 1211 – 6 March 1282), Mother Superior of the Franciscan Poor Clares nuns of Prague

References

Sources

External links

 Women's Biography: Constance of Hungary, contains several letters sent and received by Constance.

|-

1180s births
1240 deaths
Daughters of kings
Year of birth uncertain
House of Árpád
Bohemian queens consort
Hungarian princesses
12th-century Hungarian women
12th-century Hungarian people
13th-century Hungarian women
13th-century Hungarian people
12th-century Bohemian people
12th-century Bohemian women
13th-century Bohemian women
13th-century Bohemian people
Queen mothers